Fred J. Fife III (born April 11, 1937) is an American politician and engineer from Utah. A Democrat, he was a member of the Utah State Senate, representing the state's 1st senate district in Salt Lake County. Prior to his election to the State Senate, Fife served as a member of the State House from 1999 to 2002 in district 26.

Fife has a bachelor's degree from the University of Utah.

References

1937 births
Living people
Democratic Party members of the Utah House of Representatives
Politicians from Salt Lake City
Democratic Party Utah state senators
University of Utah alumni
21st-century American politicians